The Tokyo Goannas Football Club is an Australian sport team that was formed in 1991 in Japan. The club is a non-profit organization created for the purpose of advancing Australian Football and Australian sporting culture in Japan. It has won the Japan AFL (JAFL) championship trophy ten times. The club participates in the JAFL along with other teams in Tokyo, Nagoya, and Osaka.

The club's membership base includes expatriate residents, foreign nationals, and supporters. Past members have come from the United States, England, Ireland, and many local areas of Japan. The Goannas hold several events throughout the year, including a black-tie ball held at the Australian Embassy.

Japan AFL Top League Premierships

External links
 

Australian diaspora in Asia
Sports teams in Tokyo
Australian rules football in Japan
Australian rules football clubs
Australian rules football clubs established in 1991
1991 establishments in Japan